Emile Nguza Arao is a Kenyan Aircraft Maintenance Engineer and corporate executive, who was appointed as the next executive director of the Kenya Civil Aviation Authority (KCAA), effective 22 April 2022. He will be based in Nairobi, Kenya. Before that, from 20 October 2018 until 22 April 2022, he served as the executive director of the East African Civil Aviation Safety and Security Oversight Agency (EAC-Cassoa), based in Entebbe, Uganda.

Background and education
Arao is Kenyan by birth. He attended local elementary and secondary schools. He holds a Bachelor of Science degree in Aircraft Engineering Technology, awarded by Embry-Riddle Aeronautical University, in Daytona Beach, Florida, United States. His degree of Master of Business Administration, with focus on Aviation Systems Management, was also awarded by Embry-Riddle University.

Career
Arao is described as a "highly talented and accomplished aviation professional".., by James Macharia, his appointing authority and line Cabinet Minister. Arao has spent the years before the KCAA docket, as the Head of the EAC-Cassoa, an institution of the East African Community. Before his appointment as the executive director of EAC-Cassoa, he was the deputy director of that institution.

At KCAA, Arao replaces Gilbert Kibe, who has served two consecutive three-year terms at the head of the government-owned institution.

See also
 Allan Kilavuka
 Liz Aluvanze

References

External links
 Website of Kenya Civil Aviation Authority
 Meet New Aviation Authority Boss Emile Arao

Year of birth missing (living people)
Living people
Kenyan aviators
Embry–Riddle Aeronautical University
Kenyan expatriates in Uganda